NX Zero is the second album by Brazilian rock band NX Zero, released in 2006 through Arsenal/Universal. It was certified Platinum and has sold more than 100 thousand copies.

Tracks

Personnel 
 Daniel Weksler: drums
 Fi Ricardo: electric guitar
 Gee Rocha: electric guitar and backing vocals
 Di Ferrero: lead vocal
 Caco Grandino: bass guitar

References 

2006 albums
NX Zero albums
Albums produced by Rick Bonadio
Universal Music Brazil albums